Whau Lunatic Asylum (or:  Lunatic Asylum at the Whau; later: Auckland Lunatic Asylum, Avondale Lunatic Asylum, Avondale Hospital, Auckland Mental Health Hospital, Oakley Hospital;  Carrington Psychiatric Hospital; commonly Carrington/Oakley Hospital) was a psychiatric hospital on the Oakley Farm Estate in Point Chevalier, Auckland, New Zealand. Built in 1865 on the Great North Road, it was one of the largest asylums in the Colony.

Most of the site of the former asylum is currently occupied by the Unitec Institute of Technology, with smaller sections occupied by the Mason Clinic (a forensic psychiatric clinic also serving as a facility for mentally disturbed prisoners) and various private businesses.

Etymology 
"Whau" is the common name for Entelea, a species of tree endemic to New Zealand; the Whau River is located within the Auckland metropolitan area.

History

In  1851 the original "special asylum" for Auckland received  public support, and by 1853 Auckland's first asylum was built on the grounds of Auckland Hospital However, by 1862 this building was overcrowded and consequently support was sought from the provincial government In September 1863, architectural plans by a Mr. Barrett from England were submitted to the Auckland architect James Wrigley who adapted them. Henry White was the builder.  John Thomas of Oakley Creek was awarded a brick contract for the building materials, but being unable to complete the contract, it fell on Dr. Pollen to supply the rest of the bricks. Some of the bricks were produced on-site while others were produced at Dr Pollen's Avondale brickyard. While building was complete in 1867 it stopped at the left wing of the main hospital because 20,000 pounds had been spent and this was thought adequate for the community at the time.  Patients were moved from the Auckland Hospital site to the "new asylum" on 8 March 1867 

After the building was gutted by an 1877 fire, Philip Herapath supervised the reconstruction. From 1869 to 1879, Dr. Thomas Aickin served as medical superintendent. In 1879, a new wing to the asylum was under construction and stone for it was mined from nearby Oakley Creek. An estimated two-thousand tons of stone was made available in this exercise through detonation of 16 barrels of gunpowder under a 20-foot deep bed of lava, which created a miniature "earthquake" felt in the surrounding area. In 1891, Dr. T. R. King, Medical Superintendent, resigned because of ill-health, and was succeeded by Dr. Gray Hassell, who had been an administrator at the Wellington Hospital and Wellington Asylum.

In December 1900, there were 494 patients—306 males and 188 females. The staff included 31 males and 21 females. The average net cost per patient was, in 1898, £19 13s, and, in 1899, £20 8s. The average number of patients sent out cured in 1898 was 51%, and in 1899, 38%; average deaths, 1898, 7.5; in 1899, 8.8. The officials of the institution at the time were Dr. Robert Martin Beattie, medical superintendent; Dr. William Webster, assistant medical officer; Edward Newport, head attendant; Sophia Campbell, matron; and J. D. Muir, farm manager. Religious service was held on Sunday by ministers of the denominations of which patients were members.

The asylum underwent several name changes. It was known as Auckland Mental Health Hospital in 1959. In the 1960s, the work week averaged 60 hours and staff had only one day off each week. Avondale Mental Asylum became Oakley Hospital, it contained a male forensic unit and general psychiatric wards.  The institute's centenary was celebrated in Oakley Hospital in 1967. The Auckland Psychiatric Hospital was officially renamed Oakley Hospital in 1960. In 1972 the nursing staff went out on strike for better conditions, following this the hospital was divided into two, the main hospital became  Carrington Hospital and the forensic wards remained named Oakley Hospital In 1964, Dr. G.M. Tothill retired as medical superintendent and Dr P.P.E. Savage was appointed to take his place.

In 1971, the building was considered to be one of the best Victorian buildings in Auckland. In keeping with a national change, the Auckland Hospital Board took control of the hospital from the Health Department the following year. Controversial plans were considered for the hospital's M3 Ward to be turned into a medical security prison in 1986. In 1992, Carrington Hospital was closed by the Auckland Area Health Board and was purchased by a tertiary education provider, Carrington Polytec, who refurbished the building, opening the Unitec Institute of Technology School of Architecture and Design in 1994. The original building was being used by Unitec's departments of Architecture, Landscape Architecture, and Design and Contemporary Arts.

Architecture and fittings

The facade is neoclassical and has polychromatic detailing. Built of brick, it faced the junction of Great North Road and Carrington Road, leading to Mount Albert. In the central portion of the building were the dining halls, kitchen, and store-rooms, and the two adjoining wings were the male and female wards. The male dining hall was also used for theatrical and musical performances. Auxiliary wood buildings were destroyed by fire in December 1894. A new brick building was completed in 1896–1897.  The chapel of St Luke the Physician, built in 1865, was used as a dormitory since 1875, but was renovated and reopened as a chapel in 1961. The Conolly Room at the hospital was named after English doctor, Dr. John Conolly.

Grounds
A spring on the estate, and a waterfall on Oakley Creek, was ample for domestic and fire prevention purposes. There were approximately 50 milk cows on the estate, and numerous pigs. An unlimited supply of fresh eggs was obtained from the farm's poultry. Part of the land was turned into an experimental sewage farm. The oldest building has several notable trees and shrubs of interest including holm oak, sweetgum, chaste tree, and pigeonberry. now part of the Unitec Arboretum . In 1969, the Auckland University Council decided that the farm was not suitable for university development, but wanted to convert  for playing fields while Auckland Technical Institute wanted .

The majority of the land has been purchased by the New Zealand government for affordable housing developments, with 3000 to 4000 homes to be built starting in 2019.

References

Hospital buildings completed in 1865
Buildings and structures in Auckland
Psychiatric hospitals in New Zealand
Defunct hospitals in New Zealand
Hospitals established in 1865
1993 disestablishments